The gram (originally gramme; SI unit symbol g) is a unit of mass in the International System of Units (SI) equal to one one thousandth of a kilogram.

Originally defined as of 1795 as "the absolute weight of a volume of pure water equal to the cube of the hundredth part of a metre [1 cm3], and at the temperature of melting ice", the defining temperature (~0 °C) was later changed to 4 °C, the temperature of maximum density of water.

However, by the late 19th century, there was an effort to make the base unit the kilogram and the gram a derived unit. In 1960, the new International System of Units defined  a gram as one one-thousandth of a kilogram (i.e., one gram is 1×10−3 kg). The kilogram, as of 2019, is defined by the International Bureau of Weights and Measures from the fixed numerical value of the Planck constant, which is  kg⋅m2⋅s−1.

Official SI symbol
The only unit symbol for gram that is recognised by the International System of Units (SI) is "g" following the numeric value with a space, as in "640 g" to stand for "640 grams" in the English language. The SI does not permit the use of abbreviations such as "gr" (which is the symbol for grains), "gm" ("g⋅m" is the SI symbol for gram-metre) or "Gm" (the SI symbol for gigametre).

History
The word gramme  was adopted by the French National Convention in its 1795 decree revising the metric system as replacing the gravet introduced in 1793. Its definition remained that of the weight (poids) of a cubic centimetre of water.

French gramme was taken from the Late Latin term . This word—ultimately from Greek  (grámma), "letter"—had adopted a specialised meaning in Late Antiquity of "one twenty-fourth part of an ounce" (two oboli), corresponding to about 1.14 modern grams. This use of the term is found in the carmen de ponderibus et mensuris ("poem about weights and measures") composed around 400 AD.
There is also evidence that the Greek  was used in the same sense at around the same time, in the 4th century, and survived in this sense into Medieval Greek, while the Latin term did not remain current in Medieval Latin and was recovered in Renaissance scholarship.

The gram was the base unit of mass in the 19th-century centimetre–gram–second system of units (CGS). The CGS system co-existed with the metre–kilogram–second system of units (MKS), first proposed in 1901, during much of the 20th century, but the gram was displaced by the kilogram as the base unit for mass when the MKS system was chosen for the SI base units in 1960.

Uses

The gram is today the most widely used unit of measurement for non-liquid ingredients in cooking and grocery shopping worldwide. Liquid ingredients may be measured by volume rather than mass.

Many standards and legal requirements for nutrition labels on food products require relative contents to be stated per 100 g of the product, such that the resulting figure can also be read as a percentage.

Conversion factors
 1 gram (g) ≈  (gr)
 1 grain (gr) ≈ 
 1 avoirdupois ounce (oz) ≈ 
 1 troy ounce (ozt) ≈ 
 100 grams (g) ≈  (oz)
 1 carat (ct) = 0.2 grams
 1 gamma (γ) = 10−6 grams
 1 undecimogramme = 1 "eleventh-gram" = 10−11 grams in the historical quadrant–eleventh-gram–second system (QES system) a.k.a. hebdometre–undecimogramme–second system (HUS system) 
 500 grams (g) = 1 jin in the Chinese units of measurement.

Comparisons
1 gram is roughly equal to the mass of 1 small paper clip or pen cap.
The Japanese 1 yen coin has a mass of 1 gram, lighter than the British penny (3.56 g), the United States penny (2.5 g), the Euro cent (2.30 g), and the Australian 5 cent coin (2.80 g).

See also
 Conversion of units
 Duella
 Gold gram
 Orders of magnitude (mass)
Gram (Mythology)

Notes

References

Units of mass
Centimetre–gram–second system of units